General elections were held in the Bahamas on 14 March 1997. The result was a victory for the Free National Movement, which won 34 of the 40 seats. Hubert Ingraham was sworn in for a second term as Prime Minister on 18 March.

Results

Elected MPs

References

Bahamas
1997 in the Bahamas
Elections in the Bahamas